Maury Dean is an American musician, author and professor at Suffolk County Community College, whose book "The Rock Revolution" is in the Rock N' Roll Hall of Fame and the Smithsonian.

Music
Dean taught a "History of Rock N' Roll" course as well as Mass Media, Journalism, and Literature courses at Suffolk County Community College, and was a member of the band "The Woolies", whose cover of the song "Who Do You Love?" hit the #95 spot on the Billboard Hot 100 charts in 1967. Dean was also in the rock band, 'Maury Dean & The Nite Shift' – who recorded for the Detroit-based Fortune Records. He was also a writer at Motown Records, where he says he lasted all of a few days before leaving.

Author
Dean's first book, The Rock Revolution is considered one of the earliest books about rock n' roll, having been written and published in 1966. Dean has also authored Rock N' Roll Gold Rush, a book that is used as the textbook to his rock n' roll classes, as well as other professor's classes. Rock N' Roll Gold Rush also contains his opinions on music, with most of the text dedicated to his opinions on certain singles, musicians, and bands. Dean also wrote another book, about Buddy Holly, titled This'll Be the Day: The Life and Legacy of Buddy Holly. It was released in April 2009. Dean wrote another book in 2011 titled Billionaire Bingo: Saving Our Endangered Middle Class. He wrote another book released in 2021 dedicated to another one of his passions, running, titled Glory Days: Still Running Against the Wind.

While in college in the early 1960s, Dean wrote a book entitled The Hanging Gardens, about the teenage angst of attending high school in post-recession era Detroit, and having nothing much to look forward to except the long hours and boredom of building Fords on the assembly line at the River Rouge plant. He was in edits and rewrites with his publisher when “American Graffiti” hit the movie theaters and stole his thunder. It has been hinted that the hit TV series “Happy Days” was loosely based upon the unfinished manuscript of “The Hanging Gardens”.

Personal life
Dean's son, Jeremy, is the keyboardist for the band Nine Days, whose song "Absolutely" hit #6 on the Billboard charts. Dean retired from teaching in January 2010. Currently, Dean divides his time on Long Island and Detroit, Michigan, doing historical seminars.

References

Living people
American music critics
American music journalists
Suffolk County Community College faculty
Year of birth missing (living people)